The World Baseball Classic (WBC) is an international baseball tournament. It was proposed to the World Baseball Softball Confederation (WBSC) by Major League Baseball (MLB), the Major League Baseball Players Association (MLBPA), and other professional baseball leagues and their players associations around the world. It is one of the two main senior baseball tournaments sanctioned by the WBSC. The tournament is one of the world's most viewed baseball events.

It previously coexisted with Olympic baseball (until 2008) and the Baseball World Cup (until 2011) as International Baseball Federation (IBAF) sanctioned tournaments. The final men's Baseball World Cup was held in 2011.  It was discontinued in 2013, after an MLB suggestion to reorganize the international baseball calendar. WBSC accepted the suggestion after an executive meeting, giving the "World Champion" title to the WBC winner on the condition that the Classic should have direct qualifications and follow international anti-doping rules.

The tournament is the first of its kind to have the national teams of IBAF's member federations feature professional players from the major leagues around the world, including Major League Baseball. In addition to providing a format for the best baseball players in the world to compete against one another while representing their home countries, the World Baseball Classic was created in order to further promote the game around the globe.

After a three-year gap between the first two installments of the tournament, plans were made for the World Baseball Classic to be repeated every four years following the 2009 event. The third installment of the Classic was held in 2013, and the fourth was held in 2017. 

The fifth Classic was scheduled for 2021, but was postponed due to the COVID-19 pandemic. The  2023 World Baseball Classic is now being held March 8–21.

History

Modeled after the FIFA World Cup and organized in large part as a response to the International Olympic Committee's decision to remove baseball as an Olympic sport in 2005, the WBC has grown into a major sporting event worldwide. The final series in 2006 and 2009 rank among the highest-rated sporting events in Japanese television history.

The 16-team field for the inaugural 2006 tournament was pre-selected, featuring the countries judged to be the "best baseball-playing nations" in the world; no qualifying competition was held. The tournament format featured round-robin group play in the first and second rounds, followed by single-elimination semifinals and finals. The first game in WBC history saw South Korea defeat Chinese Taipei 2-0 before a crowd of 5,193 at the Tokyo Dome on March 3, 2006. South Korea went on to advance to the semifinals with a 6–0 record but lost to Japan (a team South Korea had beaten twice in the earlier rounds) for a berth in the final game. Meanwhile, Cuba defeated the Dominican Republic in the other semifinal.  Japan then defeated Cuba 10–6 to be crowned the first champion of the World Baseball Classic.

The 2009 tournament featured the same 16 teams as 2006, but the controversial round-robin format from 2006 was replaced by a modified double-elimination format for the first two rounds (the semifinals and final game remained single-elimination).  The eight teams advancing from the first round were the same as in 2006, except for a "Cinderella" performance by the Netherlands, which twice defeated the Dominican Republic to reach the second round.  In the semifinals, South Korea defeated Venezuela while Japan defeated the United States. Japan then emerged victorious for the second straight Classic, winning the final game over South Korea 5–3 in 10 innings.

The buildup to the 2013 tournament included a qualifying round for the first time, with the four lowest finishers from 2009 having to re-qualify against 12 additional teams. This resulted in two new nations making their first appearances in the WBC, as Brazil and Spain respectively replaced Panama and South Africa. The round-robin format was revived for the tournament's first-round, while the second-round remained double-elimination. Italy was the biggest surprise in the early stages of the tournament, making it to the second round with wins over Canada and Mexico. The tournament ended in an all-Caribbean championship game, with the Dominican Republic defeating Puerto Rico, which had upset two-time champion Japan in the semifinals. The Dominican Republic also became the first (and to date, only) team to go undefeated (8–0) through the tournament.

The 2017 tournament returned to the format used in 2006, where both the first and second rounds were round-robin, though with the addition of tiebreaker games if needed. Colombia and Israel qualified for the first time, with Israel, using a roster mostly of Jewish American players, able to reach the second round in its WBC debut. Defending champion Dominican Republic extended its WBC winning streak to 11 games, dating to the 2013 tournament, before also being eliminated in the second round. The United States won its first WBC championship, defeating Japan and Puerto Rico in the semifinals and finals, respectively. Puerto Rico had been undefeated in the tournament before losing in the final.

In January 2020, MLB announced the 2021 WBC would expand the field to 20 teams. The additional four participants will be determined through qualifying tournaments, which were originally planned to take place in March 2020. However, on March 12, 2020, Major League Baseball announced that the 2021 edition would be postponed due to the COVID-19 pandemic. 

The CBA from the 2021–22 Major League Baseball lockout indicated that the WBC will return in 2023. Qualification for the tournament concluded on October 5, 2022, with Nicaragua claiming the final place in a victory against Brazil. The competition is running from March 8-21, 2023.

Qualification

The first two iterations of the Classic featured the same 16 teams, chosen by invitation. A qualifying round was added leading into the 2013 tournament and takes place in the year before the WBC proper. Brazil and Spain were the first new countries to earn berths in the WBC via qualification, and so far the addition of qualifying has allowed seven nations to play in the tournament who were not part of the original 16.

The qualification setup for the 2013 and 2017 WBCs featured the top 12 finishing teams from the previous WBC being automatically entered in the following edition, while the four lowest finishers (the teams that finished in last place in their first-round pools) were relegated to the qualifying round. Qualifying consisted of four four-team modified double-elimination tournaments, with the winners earning the last four slots in the main tournament.

With the 2023 WBC expanding to 20 teams, the qualifying format changed as well. All 16 participants from the 2017 WBC received automatic bids. The restructured qualifying round consisted of a pair of six-team double-elimination tournaments, from which the winners and runners-up advanced to play in the 2023 WBC.

Results

Teams reaching the top four
After the conclusion of each WBC championship game, players from the losing team receive silver medals, followed by the winners receiving gold medals. The third-place team receives bronze medals at a separate date. The WBC does not hold a third-place playoff, so the ranking of the third- and fourth-placed teams is determined by the WBSC.

Performance of nations

A total of 20 nations have competed in the WBC proper, with 14 appearing in all five editions. Japan has been the most successful, as the only nation with multiple WBC titles (2006, 2009), the nation with the most wins in WBC play (23), and as the only nation to reach the championship round in all four WBCs. The Dominican Republic owns the best overall winning percentage in WBC games at .750 (18–6 record), bolstered by its 8–0 mark en route to the 2013 title. A surprising first-round elimination in 2009 stands out as the Dominican's only poor showing. If qualifying rounds are included, Israel also has a .750 winning percentage (9–3 record), with a 4–2 record in the WBC itself.

Along with Japan, three other nations have advanced to at least the second round in all four WBCs: Cuba, Puerto Rico, and the United States. The US posted a 10–10 overall record through the first three WBCs, with only one appearance in the semifinals. The Americans broke through in 2017, going 6–2 on their way to their first WBC title. Cuba lived up to its history of strong international play by reaching the finals of the inaugural WBC in 2006 before losing to Japan. However, subsequent Cuban teams have failed to make a significant mark on the tournament, making three straight second-round exits and going just 2–7 in second-round games since 2009. Meanwhile, Caribbean rival Puerto Rico made consecutive appearances in the WBC finals in 2013 and 2017, albeit losing both, and stood second to Japan for the most all-time WBC wins (20) after the 2017 tournament. Conversely, of the 14 teams to appear in all four tournaments, two have never made the second round: Canada and China. Australia, having also appeared in all four previous tournaments, made it to the second round for the first time in 2023.

Performance of confederations

The World Baseball Softball Confederation (WBSC) currently divides all countries into five confederations based on their region: Africa, Americas, Asia, Europe, and Oceania. Currently, the two best confederations in international baseball are Americas and Asia, as both confederations add up to 14 of the 16 top four finishes (with two titles each). While the appearances of the Americas region expands throughout, all appearances for Asia in the World Baseball Classic were by countries in East Asia in particular. Europe holds the other 2 of the 16 top four finishes, both coming from the Netherlands with the help of the Dutch Caribbean. Italy's and Israel's top eight appearances in 2013 and 2017 respectively have led the region's growth in baseball in addition to the Netherlands' two top four finishes. As for Africa and Oceania, both regions lack a baseball scene in general, although South Africa and Australia are indisputably the best two countries in baseball in their respective regions due to their strong leagues. In addition, both countries make up all of the World Baseball Classic appearances for their respective regions.

As decorated as the Americas region is, only five countries in the region have ever made the top four: Cuba, Dominican Republic, Puerto Rico, United States, and Venezuela. The Dominican Republic and United States are the only countries to earn first place, in 2013 and 2017 respectively. In addition to the aforementioned champions, Puerto Rico is the only other country to have made the top four more than once. As for Asia, the countries in East Asia dominate the baseball scene in that region, as Japan and South Korea are the only two countries in that region to appear more than once in the top four. On top of that, Japan is the only country in the world to appear in the top four in all iterations of the World Baseball Classic, with two first place finishes earned. As such, all bids so far have been granted to those two regions.

Honors

Most Valuable Player
The most significant award for individual performance during the tournament is the Most Valuable Player Award. Whichever player wins it receives a trophy after the final. The inaugural winner of the award in 2006 was Japan's Daisuke Matsuzaka, who pitched 13 innings and finished with a 3–0 record. Soon after this performance, Matsuzaka received a multimillion-dollar contract to join the Boston Red Sox of America's Major League Baseball. Again in the 2009 World Baseball Classic, Matsuzaka received the world classic MVP, finishing with a record of 3–0 and an ERA of 2.54. In 2013, Robinson Canó won MVP after hitting .469 with two home runs and six RBI over the course of the tournament. Toronto Blue Jays pitcher Marcus Stroman took home the award in 2017 for the United States. Stroman posted a 2.35 ERA over three starts and no-hit Puerto Rico through six innings in an 8–0 win in the Finals.

All–WBC teams
At the end of each edition of the World Baseball Classic, an all-star team is selected based on their play in the tournament.  Three pitchers, eight other position players (one each at each position, including three outfielders), and a designated hitter are named to the team. Japanese pitcher Daisuke Matsuzaka and Puerto Rican catcher Yadier Molina are the only players to be named to the All–WBC team twice.

Overall, players representing 10 countries have been named to an All-WBC team, with Japan and Puerto Rico leading the way with nine representatives each.

Statistical leaders
All-time WBC individual leaders in various statistical categories through the end of the 2017 tournament, excluding qualifier games.

Batting

Pitching

Trophy

The winning team of each World Baseball Classic is rewarded a large silver trophy as its primary recognition.  The two trophies earned by Japan during the inaugural and second classics have been on display at the Japanese Baseball Hall of Fame.

Rules of play
In addition to the standard rules of baseball, the World Baseball Classic employs the following additional rules:

Pitch counts
A pitcher cannot pitch more than:
85 pitches per game in the Qualifying Round (all tournaments since 2013, when this round was introduced)
65 pitches per game in the First Round (all tournaments except 2009, in which the limit was 70)
80 pitches per game in the Second Round (all tournaments except 2009, in which the limit was 85)
95 pitches per game in the Championship Round (all tournaments except 2009, in which the limit was 100)

A pitcher can still finish a batter's plate appearance even if the limit is reached, but must come out after completing the plate appearance.

A pitcher cannot pitch until:
a minimum of four days have passed since he last pitched, if he threw 50 or more pitches when he last pitched
a minimum of one day has passed since he last pitched, if he threw 30 or more pitches when he last pitched
a minimum of one day has passed since any second consecutive day on which the pitcher pitched

Mercy rules
To prevent one-sided contests, games are ended early if one team is ahead by:

10 or more runs after any complete inning, beginning with the completion of the seventh inning, or;
15 or more runs after any complete inning, beginning with the completion of the fifth inning

These mercy rules do not apply during the knockout stage.

Designated hitter
The designated hitter rule applies for all games.

Extra innings
From 2009 through 2017, starting with the 11th inning, teams automatically start with runners on first and second base. The baserunners are the players in the two batting order positions previous to the leadoff batter for the inning (or substitutes called in to pinch-run for those players). Organizers put this rule in place starting with the 2009 tournament, although originally, it did not come into effect until the 13th inning. The intention behind the rule is to help ensure extra-inning games end in as timely a manner as possible, reducing the chance of seeing marathon extra-inning games that place undue strain on players, particularly pitchers. As no extra-inning games in either the 2009 or 2013 WBCs reached the point where the rule came into play, it took until the 2017 WBC for it to affect a game's outcome. There were three such games in 2017, and all three were decided in the 11th inning.

In 2023, the rule was changed to bring the WBC in line with Major League Baseball. The 2023 World Baseball Classic rules and regulations reads: "For any inning beginning with the 10th inning, the Federation Team at bat shall begin the inning with a runner on second base. The batter who leads off an inning shall continue to be the batter who would lead off the inning in the absence of this extra-innings rule. The runner on second base shall be the player (or a substitute for such player) in the batting order immediately preceding the batter who leads off the inning."

Video replay review
Beginning in the 2023 World Baseball Classic, video review is available for all situations as it would be during a Major League Baseball regular season game.

Run differential
Unlike regular season play, where the number of runs by which a team wins a game is not relevant, the number of runs by which a WBC team wins may be relevant if a tie later develops in the standings. In such cases, teams are ranked by their Team Quality Balance, which rewards them for winning by as many runs as possible, and for winning with as few of their batters getting out as possible when batting in the bottom of the inning. This caused problems during the 2013 WBC, where one game spawned a bench-clearing brawl between the Canadian and Mexican teams (Canadian hitter Chris Robinson had bunted for a base hit after Canada had already taken a large lead, causing Mexican pitcher Arnold Leon to throw three consecutive pitches at the next hitter, Rene Tosoni).

These tiebreakers were changed starting in the 2017 WBC to be "fewest runs allowed per inning of defense in head-to-head games", which still places an emphasis on scoring as many runs as possible (and allowing fewest runs as possible).

Eligibility and participation

Eligibility
A player is eligible to participate on a World Baseball Classic team if any one of the following criteria is met:
The player is a citizen of the nation the team represents.
The player is qualified for citizenship or to hold a passport under the laws of a nation represented by a team, but has not been granted citizenship or been issued a passport; in this case, the player may be made eligible by WBCI upon petition by the player or team.
The player is a permanent legal resident of the nation or territory the team represents.
The player was born in the nation or territory the team represents.
The player has one parent who is, or if deceased was, a citizen of the nation the team represents.
The player has one parent who was born in the nation or territory the team represents.

Player participation
In 2006, many high caliber players from both Major League Baseball and in leagues around the world participated in the World Baseball Classic. Amongst the players that made the All–WBC team were Americans Derek Jeter and Ken Griffey Jr. From Japan, Daisuke Matsuzaka, Ichiro Suzuki and Tomoya Satozaki were on the team. Other internationals included players from Cuba—Yulieski Gurriel, Yoandy Garlobo and Yadel Martí; and from the Dominican Republic—Albert Pujols, Pedro Martínez and José Bautista. The 2009 Classic saw a similarly high-profile field, with a number of players such as Hall of Famers Pedro Martínez, Iván Rodríguez and Chipper Jones and the major international debuts of Cuba's Yoenis Céspedes and Aroldis Chapman.

For the 2013 tournament, many high-profile players decided not to participate, including key players from the 2009 Japanese team such as Yu Darvish, Ichiro, and Hisashi Iwakuma. However, other prominent players came, such as Miguel Cabrera, David Wright, R. A. Dickey, Joey Votto, Adrián González, Robinson Canó, and José Reyes, among many others.

In 2017, former All-Stars such as Adam Jones, Chris Archer, Buster Posey, Paul Goldschmidt, Andrew McCutchen and others played for the United States. For the Dominican Republic, former All-Stars Adrián Beltré, Robinson Canó, Manny Machado, José Reyes, Edinson Vólquez, and more participated. Adrián González played once more for Mexico, and Yadier Molina and Carlos Beltrán represented Puerto Rico alongside up-and-coming stars such as Javier Báez, Carlos Correa, and Francisco Lindor. Venezuela's roster included José Altuve and Miguel Cabrera.

In 2023, former All-Stars on the U.S. team included Mike Trout, Nolan Arenado, Pete Alonso, Mookie Betts, Tim Anderson, Jeff McNeil, J.T. Realmuto, Kyle Schwarber, Trea Turner, Kyle Tucker, Ryan Pressly, Lance Lynn, Miles Mikolas, and Paul Goldschmidt.

Involvement of professional leagues
The tournament was announced in May  by Commissioner of Baseball Bud Selig. Major League Baseball had been attempting to create such a tournament for at least two years; negotiations with the players' union (MLBPA) and with the team owners had held the plan back. Owners, notably New York Yankees owner George Steinbrenner, had been concerned about their star players being injured in international play before the beginning of spring training, and the professional season. This was a concern for the MLBPA as well, but their primary objection was with drug testing. MLB wanted the stricter Olympic standards in place for the tournament, while the union wanted current MLB standards in place. Eventually, a deal was reached on insurance for player contracts and a fairly tough drug testing standard. MLB teams would not be able to directly block their players from participating.

Similarly, Nippon Professional Baseball (NPB) and its players' association had a disagreement over participation in the tournament. While the owners initially agreed to the invitation, the players' union was concerned about the time of year the tournament was scheduled to take place, as well as their right to be better represented for the  tournament. On September 16, 2005, after four months of negotiations, NPB officially notified the IBAF and MLB they had accepted the invitation. In September 2012, after having threatened to boycott the event despite its domestic popularity, Japanese players agreed to take part after reaching a compromise with tournament organizers on sharing sponsorship and licensing revenue.

Media coverage

The tournament is one of the world's most-viewed baseball events. The 2009 Classic Final had more viewers than the 2009 World Series Game 6, making it the sixth most viewed sporting event in the world that year. The tournament has gained national-level popularity in Japan, Taiwan, Venezuela, the Dominican Republic, Puerto Rico, Cuba, Nicaragua, Dutch Caribbean, South Korea, Mexico, Panama and has decent ratings in the Czech Republic and United States.

The main audience for the classic is the Japanese archipelago. The number of people who watched the 2023 tournament between Samurai Japan and Blue Wave is higher than the number of World Series viewers every year in history. The lowest match was between Samurai Japan and China, but it received five times more viewership than the 2022 World Series.

In South Korea, nearly 10 million people watched the 2009 Classic final.

The tournament is currently being broadcast in China and is growing in popularity. The 2023 World Baseball Classic will be broadcast on China's largest websites, including Sina Weibo, TikTok, and Bilibili, Kuaishou

Though the first two Classic finals were shown on ESPN in the United States, the entire 2013 tournament was shown exclusively on MLB Network domestically. MLB Network also had the television rights for the 2017 Classic. Also at the moment, ESPN Deportes provides Spanish-language coverage and ESPN Radio has audio rights for the Classic. Sportsnet is the current broadcaster in Canada while ESPN America covers the tournament for the United Kingdom, Ireland and other parts of Europe.

The first qualifier round of the 2017 Classic aired in the United States and Puerto Rico on the MLB Network; and in Australia, New Zealand, and selected surrounding islands on ESPN.

Attendance
Excluding qualifier games.

Venues
Unlike comparable tournaments the FIFA World Cup and FIBA Basketball World Cup where one country hosts the entire event, each WBC has used multiple hosts spread around different parts of the world. Thus far, seven different nations have hosted at least one WBC pool, with each edition of the tournament featuring games played in Asia, Latin America, and the United States. The championship round is traditionally held at Major League Baseball stadiums in the U.S.

The following table lists nations who've hosted any WBC rounds in the first five iterations of the event, not including qualifiers, and without regard to whether a nation hosted multiple rounds in the same year.

See also

References

External links
Official website

 
Classic
Quadrennial sporting events
Recurring sporting events established in 2006
March sporting events
World Baseball Softball Confederation competitions